Agga Mahethi was the empress consort and the chief wife of King Anawrahta of Pagan (Bagan). She was also known as the Queen of Southern Palace ("Taung Pyinthe"). Her only child, Saw Lu, succeeded the Pagan throne.

References

Bibliography
 

Chief queens consort of Pagan
Year of death unknown
Year of birth unknown
11th-century Burmese women